Villembray is a commune in the Oise department and in the Hauts-de-France region in northern France.

See also
 Communes of the Oise department

References

Communes of Oise